Complete results for Women's Super Combined competition at the 2009 World Championships.  It was run on February 6, the third race of the championships.

References
 FIS-ski.com - official results
 Ski Racing.com - Worlds: Zettel wins combined gold as Vonn DQ's - 06-Feb-2009

Women's super combined
2009 in French women's sport
FIS